Rhysopterus is a genus of flowering plants belonging to the family Apiaceae.

Its native range is Western Central USA.

Species:
 Rhysopterus plurijugus J.M.Coult. & Rose

References

Apiaceae
Apiaceae genera